Diplomatic Passport may refer to:

 Diplomatic passport, a passport used by diplomats
 Diplomatic Passport (TV series), a Canadian interview television series 
 Diplomatic Passport (film), a 1954 British thriller film